Cawsand Bay is a bay on the southeast coast of Cornwall, England, United Kingdom.

Cawsand Bay is oriented north–south, opening eastward into Plymouth Sound about 3 miles (5 km) south-southwest of Plymouth, as the crow flies.

Cawsand Bay is about one mile (1.6 km) across and about a mile and a half (2.4 km) wide across its mouth and is bounded by Penlee Point to the south.

A once-popular ballad entitled "Harry Grady and Miss Elinor Ford, the Rich Heiress" appeared as early as 1840 in Hamilton Moore's Nautical Sketches (William Edward Painter, 1840). It was included under the title "Cawsand Bay" in Sir Arthur Quiller-Couch's The Oxford Book of Ballads (Clarendon Press, 1910).

References

Bays of Cornwall